First Presbyterian Church of Spring Hill (The New School Presbyterian Church at Spring Hill) is a historic church on S. Main Street in Spring Hill, Tennessee.

It was built in 1888 and added to the National Register in 1984.

References

Presbyterian churches in Tennessee
Churches on the National Register of Historic Places in Tennessee
Churches completed in 1888
19th-century Presbyterian church buildings in the United States
Churches in Maury County, Tennessee
National Register of Historic Places in Maury County, Tennessee